The year 1918 in archaeology involved some significant events.

Explorations

Excavations
 Ballshi inscription, a 9th-century epigraph testifying to the christianization of Bulgaria

Publications

Finds

Awards

Miscellaneous

Births
 11 February – Anne Stine Ingstad, Norwegian archaeologist, co-discoverer of Viking artifacts at L'Anse aux Meadows (d. 1997)
 8 March – Mendel L. Peterson, American underwater archaeologist (d. 2003)
 20 May – Carlos J. Gradin, Argentine archaeologist (d.  2002)
 24 June – Elizabeth Eames, English archaeologist (d. 2008)
 20 August – Crystal Bennett, Alderney-born archaeologist of Jordan (d. 1987)
 25 October – Donald Wiseman, Professor of Assyriology at the University of London (d. 2010)
 18 December – Joyce Reynolds, English epigrapher (d. 2022)

Deaths
 27 January – Canon William Greenwell, English archaeologist notable for his Grimes Graves excavations (b. 1820)

References

Archaeology
Archaeology
Archaeology by year